"Too Late (True Love)" is a song by The Real Milli Vanilli. It was released in 1991 and peaked at #26 in Austria, #65 in Germany. The song was also released in France, but failed to enter the singles chart. Gina Mohammed is the lead vocalist on this track.  Notable is the fact that John Davis is pictured on the single's cover, although he did not perform in the song.

Track listing
CD maxi single

Charts

References

1991 singles
Milli Vanilli songs
Song recordings produced by Frank Farian
Hansa Records singles
1991 songs